Guarino Foscari (c. 1080 - 6 February 1158) was an Italian Catholic Augustinian canon regular and also the Cardinal-Bishop of Palestrina from December 1144 after his relative Pope Lucius II elevated him into the cardinalate.

He is better known as "Guarinus of Palestrina" and is noted for his charitable compassion for the poor of Palestrina.

Pope Alexander III canonized him as a saint of the Roman Catholic of Church in 1159.

Life
Guarino Foscari was born in Bologna around 1080; he was a member of the noble Guarini household while his mother was a Foscari.

Foscari was well educated and was quite fond of literature. Despite opposition from his parents he was ordained to the priesthood at the age of 24. He was later named as the Canon of the Cathedral of Bologna. He was still a priest when around 1104 he joined the Santa Croce Congregation of canons at Mortara. Prior to his departure he donated all of his goods for the building of a hospital.

At the age of 59 he was elected to fill an opening that the death of the bishop of Pavia created but evaded his episcopal consecration when he climbed out of a window. He went into hiding until another election was held.

During the Advent season of 1144, Pope Lucius II sent for him and he again attempted to avoid higher office. Lucius II had Guarino arrested, but he escaped for a brief period of time. But soon after Lucius II had him appointed in December 1144 as the Cardinal-Bishop of Palestrina. He also bestowed on him a number of gifts suitable to a person of his new standing, including some fine horses, which Guarino sold and distributing the funds to the poor.

Feeling unworthy of the position, he left his post twice. The first time, he was recalled from Subiaco due to the orders of Pope Eugene III. The second time he went to Ostia, but finding Saracens there, he fled to Rome. He was bishop for thirteen years and remained out of the troublesome Roman politics that so defined the time and temperament of Rome. As a cardinal he participated in three conclaves that saw the elections of Eugene III, Pope Anastasius IV, and Pope Adrian IV.

He died at the age of 78 on 6 February 1158; he was loved for his humility and also for his great generosity to the poor. He was canonized by Pope Alexander III in 1159.

Guarino was buried in the crypt of the Cathedral of Sant'Agapito. In 1473 Palestrina was looted and his remains were hidden for fear of desecration. Although a search was made in 1754, they were not located.

See also

References

Bibliography
Paul Burns, Butler's Lives of the Saints (2000), p. 66,  The Liturgical Press;

External links
 Biography 

1080s births
1158 deaths
12th-century Italian cardinals
Clergy from Bologna
Italian saints
Cardinal-bishops of Palestrina
Augustinian canons
Cardinal-nephews
12th-century Christian saints
12th-century Italian Roman Catholic bishops
Venerated Catholics